Sonic Assassins were a UK band formed in 1977, composed of members from Hawkwind and local Devon band Ark.

Formation
Hawkwind main writers Robert Calvert (vocals) and Dave Brock (guitar) were living in Devon towards the end of 1977 and had befriended local band Ark, who had often supported Hawkwind at some of their West Country gigs. Brock and Calvert instigated the formation of the Sonic Assassins with Ark members Harvey Bainbridge (bass) (b. Harvey Frederick Bainbridge, 24 September 1949, Dorset), Paul Hayles (keyboards) (born 15 November 1948) and Martin Griffin (drums) (born 1950, Plymouth, Devon died 6 January 2020). The name Sonic Assassins had originally been coined by Michael Moorcock to describe Hawkwind in a FRENDZ comic strip, 1971.

Recording

Sonic Assassins played one gig, at the Barnstaple Queens Hall on 23 December 1977, with a day of overdubs being added some time later at Griffin's studio. During the rehearsals in the run-up to the gig, it was uncertain whether Calvert would be taking part and the set on the night deviated from the one Calvert was expecting which resulted in some improvisations from the frontman, as can be heard on "Over the Top" when he expected the band to launch into a version of "Master of the Universe". The set was to be released as an album, but it was eventually released only on various EPs and compilations:

"Over the Top" (Calvert/Brock) 7:53 — from The Weird Tapes Volume 1 and Sonic Assassins EP
"Magnu" / "Angels of Life" (Brock) 4:23 — from The Weird Tapes Volumes 1 and Hawkwind Anthology
"Free Fall" (Calvert/Bainbridge) 7:54 — from The Weird Tapes Volumes 1 and Sonic Assassins EP
"Death Trap" (Calvert/Brock) 4:30 — from The Weird Tapes Volumes 1 and Sonic Assassins EP
"The Golden Void" (Brock) 4:43 — from Hawkwind, Friends and Relations Volume 1 and The Best Of...

Post
During Hawkwind's tour of the United States in early 1978, Simon House left to join a David Bowie tour and Paul Hayles filled in as his replacement. On returning to the UK, Hawkwind were dissolved and resurrected as the Hawklords, with Bainbridge and Griffin forming the rhythm section.

"Death Trap" was recorded a month later for Hawkwind's PXR5 album, while "Free Fall" was recorded for the Hawklords' 1978 25 Years On album. Although "Angels of Life" has a "We're angels of life, we're angels of death" vocal, it bears no musical similarity to the "Angels of Death" song from the 1981 Hawkwind album Sonic Attack.

References

Hawkwind
English rock music groups